Kugi Uswag Sugbo, commonly known as KUSUG, is a local political party based in Cebu City, Philippines and was founded by former Mayor Alvin Garcia.

It is allied with Partido Barug of incumbent mayor Michael Rama since 2013.

Electoral performance

Mayor

Vice Mayor

See also 
 Partido Barug
 Partido Panaghiusa
 Bando Osmeña – Pundok Kauswagan

References 

Local political parties in the Philippines
Politics of Cebu City
Regionalist parties
Regionalist parties in the Philippines